Zhang Junning may refer to:

Janine Chang (張鈞甯; born 1982), Taiwanese actress
Johnny Zhang (张峻宁; born 1985), Chinese actor